The Bogd Khan Mountain (Mongolian: Богд хан уул, lit.

World Heritage Status 
The Bogd Khan Mountain, along with Mongolia's other sacred mountains Burkhan Khaldun and Otgontenger, was added to the UNESCO World Heritage Tentative List on August 6, 1996 in the Cultural category.  World Heritage sites are those that exhibit universal natural or cultural significance, or both. In 1783 the local Mongolian government of the Qing dynasty declared the Bogd Khan a protected site, for its beauty.

Protection in 1681 and Zanabazar's two pavilions 
Mount Bogd Khan Uul was already protected during Zanabazar's time. Zanabazar was said to have meditated under a tree called Janchivsembe in Nukht Valley of Mount Bogd Khan Uul. Russian envoy V.S.Turskii, the son of a Tobolsk landowner, was sent to the 1st Jebtsundamba Khutugtu Zanabazar (1635–1723) and his brother Tusheet Khan Chakhundorj in 1681. In his report he makes the following notes when covering the period June 2, 1681 to June 16, 1681 (he describes two pavilions that were built somewhere between the current Sky Resort and MCS Coca-Cola Plant in eastern Ulaanbaatar):

Imperial recognition in 1778 
In 1778 the Mongolian governor (minister) of Khuree (Urga, present day Ulan-Bator) Sanzaidorj sent a letter to the Qianlong Emperor requesting approval of annual ceremonies dedicated to Mount Bogd Khan Uul. The Mongolian letter and the reply from Beijing in Mongolian is kept in the Central State Archives of Mongolia.

The text of governor Sanzaidorj's translated letter reads:

To this the Board for Administration of Outlying Regions in Beijing replied in Mongolian:

Ceremony on Tsetsee Gun peak 
The ceremony of worshipping Mount Bogd Khan Uul used to take place over two days. Religious ceremonies were held on the first day which was followed by a festive naadam on the second day. There are two ovoos (sacred pile of stones or cairns) on Tsetsee Gun (Duke Tsetsee) peak. The east ovoo was called Religion Ovoo, the west was called State Ovoo. Each Ovoo received food offerings, full cow offering and a number of sheep offerings. These offerings were said to be arranged as tall as the ceiling of a 10 walled ger. The various dairy products, airag and yoghurt sent from the surrounding provinces were collected a month in advance in Chuluut gorge. On the day of the ceremony these offerings were all loaded on camels and taken up to Tsetsee Gun peak. Khans and nobles (noyans) would ascend on horseback up State Gathering Gorge early before sunrise. At the same time around 50 lamas including high-ranking Tsogchin Unzad and Gesgui would make their way from Ikh Khuree (Urga proper) while around 40 lamas would make their way from Manjusri Monastery (built in 1733) on the south side of the mountain and join them at the Ovoo. First the Khan's decree was read. The credentials written on yellow silk and other ceremonial silk was burnt in a censer. Then the worshippers would circle the Ovoos clockwise each according to their rank holding silk scarves and offering select food offerings in respect. The two peaks of Mount Bogd Khan Uul were given the title Duke (гүн) and awarded a salary of 50 lang. This salary was offered to them wrapped in silk on top of the mountain.  After the ceremony the food was distributed to the 30 monastic schools and 10 monasteries. The spirits of the mountain were visualized as a strong Khangarid bird and a white-bearded old man riding a deer (Цагаан Өвгөн). These sacred characters could be seen participating in the Tsam dances. Eventually an eight-sided, golden-roofed temple was built for the ceremony. It was permanently staffed by two monks who were met weekly by the mountain police to replenish their candle oil and food supplies.

References 

Mountains of Mongolia
Ulaanbaatar
Biosphere reserves of Mongolia
Two-thousanders of Mongolia